Platit AG is a Swiss company that manufactures and markets coating equipment for the manufacturing cutting tool industry. It is one of the technology leaders  in Physical vapor deposition coating technology .,

Platit was founded by the Blösch group in 1992 .The company’s headquarters are located in Selzach, Switzerland,. Subsidiaries are located in the Chicago, USA, Shanghai, China,  Seoul, South Korea, Roskilde, Denmark, Switzerland and the Czech Republic. There are 465 installations on 38 countries. Platit is wholly mainly owned by BCI Group, a Swiss conglomerate that focusses on products for the Swiss watch industry.

Competitors include Oerlikon Balzers, Ionbond (IHI Japan), Hauzer Techno Coating (IHI Japan), (Metaplas Ionbond), and Cemecon Germany.

Products

PVD coatings are typically applied to cutting tools – such as drills, hobs or endmills -, molds and dies, and machine components to extend their lifetime. Typical PVD coatings include Titanium nitride (TiN), TiCN, or TiAlN, AlCrN, Nanocomposites, TripleCoatings3, and QuadCoatings4.

Platit manufactures Cathodic arc coating units to deposit PVD coatings. Tools or machine components are loaded into a vacuum chamber, and heated to several hundred degrees Celsius to start a process in which metal from cathodes is evaporated and deposited on the substrates. Typically, cathodes are planar (flat), while Platit's LARC process (LAteral Rotated Cathodes) features cylindrical cathodes that have several advantages over the traditional setup, including the ability to deposit smooth coating surfaces and a wide variance of coating structures.,

2017 Platit introduced the revolutionary LACS® Technology, which combines arcing and sputtering. 
As Platit's customers are generally small- to medium-size companies, their coating units tend to be smaller in chamber size and capacity than competitor's models. But Platit produces big dedicated coating units also, e.g. for long broaches.

References

External links 
 Website of Platit
 PVD

Platit AG